Ceretto may refer to:

 Ceretto Lomellina, municipality in the Province of Pavia in the Italian region Lombardy
 John Ceretto  (1898 - 1978), American politician

See also 

 Ceretti